Douglas Dean 'Ted' Hammond (1936? – 25 November 2012) was an American veterinarian and amusement park consultant based in Asia.

Career
Before graduating from veterinary school in 1968, Ted Hammond worked with the Navy Marine Mammal Program near Point Mugu. He was a founding and honorary life member of the International Association for Aquatic Animal Medicine. Hammond was credited with research leading to a potential vaccine for melioidosis, caused by Burkholderia pseudomallei, based on his work as the park curator of Ocean Park Hong Kong. He had been recruited by Dr. Ken Norris to work at Ocean Park.

Hammond was instrumental in brokering the sales of live dolphins caught in the Taiji dolphin drive to many places around the world including Turkey, Mexico, and the Dominican Republic.

He was a primary witness in a lawsuit between one of his clients and dolphin activist Ric O'Barry.

Personal life
Hammond grew up in Ventura County, California, and graduated from Oxnard High School. He received his Doctor of Veterinary Medicine from the University of California, Davis in 1968. Hammond died in 2012 following complications from heart valve surgery in Las Vegas, Nevada.

Bibliography

References 

American veterinarians
Male veterinarians
Living people
Place of birth missing (living people)
Year of birth missing (living people)
University of California, Davis alumni